Targhar railway station is a proposed railway station in Navi Mumbai's Raigad district, Maharashtra. Its code is TRGR. It will serve Targhar area of Navi Mumbai. The station proposal included two platforms.

References

Railway stations in Raigad district
Mumbai CR railway division
Transport in Navi Mumbai
Proposed railway stations in India
Mumbai Suburban Railway stations